Ralf Schaberg (born 1977) is a German slalom canoeist who competed at the international level from 1994 to 1999.

He won a gold medal in the K1 team event at the 1999 ICF Canoe Slalom World Championships in La Seu d'Urgell and also at the 1998 European Championships in Roudnice nad Labem.

References

German male canoeists
Living people
1977 births
Medalists at the ICF Canoe Slalom World Championships